Catherine Lucille Moore (January 24, 1911 – April 4, 1987) was an American science fiction and fantasy writer, who first came to prominence in the 1930s writing as C. L. Moore. She was among the first women to write in the science fiction and fantasy genres, though earlier woman writers in these genres include Clare Winger Harris, Greye La Spina, and Francis Stevens, among others. Nevertheless, Moore's work paved the way for many other female speculative fiction writers.

Moore married her first husband Henry Kuttner in 1940, and most of her work from 1940 to 1958 (Kuttner's death) was written by the couple collaboratively. They were prolific co-authors under their own names, although more often under any one of several pseudonyms.

As "Catherine Kuttner", she had a brief career as a   television scriptwriter from 1958 to 1962. She retired from writing in 1963.

Early life
Moore was born on January 24, 1911, in Indianapolis, Indiana. She was chronically ill as a child and spent much of her time reading literature of the fantastic. She left college during the Great Depression to work as a secretary at the Fletcher Trust Company in Indianapolis.

Early career
The Vagabond, a student-run magazine at Indiana University, published three of her stories when she was a student there. The three short stories, all with a fantasy theme and all credited to "Catherine Moore", appeared in 1930/31. Her first professional sales appeared in pulp magazines beginning in 1933.  Her decision to publish under the name "C. L. Moore" stemmed not from a desire to hide her gender, but to keep her employers at Fletcher Trust from knowing that she was working as a writer on the side.

Her early work included two significant series in Weird Tales, then edited by Farnsworth Wright. One features the rogue and adventurer Northwest Smith wandering through the Solar System; the other features the swordswoman/warrior Jirel of Joiry, one of the first female protagonists in sword-and-sorcery fiction. Both series are sometimes named for their lead characters. One of the Northwest Smith stories, "Nymph of Darkness" (Fantasy Magazine (April 1935); expurgated version, Weird Tales (Dec 1939)) was written in collaboration with Forrest J Ackerman.

The most famous Northwest Smith story is "Shambleau", which was also Moore's first professional sale. It originally appeared in the November 1933 issue of Weird Tales, netting her $100, and later becoming a popular anthology reprint. Her most famous Jirel story is also the first one, "Black God's Kiss", which was the cover story in the October 1934 issue of Weird Tales, subtitled "the weirdest story ever told" (see figure). Moore's early stories were notable for their emphasis on the senses and emotions, which was unusual in genre fiction at the time.

Moore's work also appeared in Astounding Science Fiction magazine throughout the 1940s. Several stories written for that magazine were later collected in her first published book, Judgment Night (1952) One of them, the novella "No Woman Born" (1944), was to be included in more than 10 different science fiction anthologies including The Best of C. L. Moore.

Included in that collection were "Judgment Night" (first published in August and September 1943), the lush rendering of a future galactic empire with a sober meditation on the nature of power and its inevitable loss; "The Code" (July 1945), an homage to the classic Faust with modern theories and Lovecraftian dread; "Promised Land" (February 1950) and "Heir Apparent" (July 1950), both documenting the grim twisting that mankind must undergo in order to spread into the Solar System; and "Paradise Street" (September 1950), a futuristic take on the Old West conflict between lone hunter and wilderness-taming settlers.

Marriage to Henry Kuttner and literary collaborations
Moore met Henry Kuttner, also a science fiction writer, in 1936 when he wrote her a fan letter under the impression that "C. L. Moore" was a man. They soon collaborated on a story that combined Moore's signature characters, Northwest Smith and Jirel of Joiry: "Quest of the Starstone" (1937).

Moore and Kuttner married in 1940 and thereafter wrote many of their stories in collaboration, sometimes under their own names, but more often using the joint pseudonyms C. H. Liddell, Lawrence O'Donnell, or Lewis Padgett — most commonly the latter, a combination of their mothers' maiden names. Moore still occasionally wrote solo work during this period, including the frequently anthologized "No Woman Born" (1944). A selection of Moore's solo short fiction work from 1942 through 1950 was collected in 1952's Judgement Night. Moore's only solo novel, Doomsday Morning, appeared in 1957.

The vast majority of Moore's work in the period, though, was written as part of a very prolific partnership. Working together, the couple managed to combine Moore's style with Kuttner's more cerebral storytelling. They continued to work in science fiction and fantasy, and their works include two frequently anthologized sci-fi classics: "Mimsy Were the Borogoves" (February 1943), the basis for the film The Last Mimzy (2007), and Vintage Season (September 1946), the basis for the film Timescape (1992). As "Lewis Padgett" they also penned two mystery novels: The Brass Ring (1946) and The Day He Died (1947).

Later career
After Kuttner's death in 1958, Moore continued teaching her writing course at the University of Southern California, but permanently retired from writing any further literary fiction. Instead, working as "Catherine Kuttner", she carved out a short-lived career as a scriptwriter for Warner Bros. television, writing episodes of the westerns Sugarfoot, Maverick, and The Alaskans, as well as the detective series 77 Sunset Strip, all between 1958 and 1962. However, upon marrying Thomas Reggie (who was not a writer) in 1963, she ceased writing entirely.

Moore was the author guest of honor at Kansas City, Missouri's fantasy and science fiction convention BYOB-Con 6, held over the U.S. Memorial Day weekend in May 1976. She was a pro guest of honor at Denvention II (the 39th World Science Fiction Convention) in 1981.

In a 1979 interview, she said that she and a writer friend were collaborating on a fantasy story, and how it could possibly form the basis of a new series. But nothing was ever published.

In 1981, Moore received two annual awards for her career in fantasy literature: the World Fantasy Award for Life Achievement, chosen by a panel of judges at the World Fantasy Convention, and the Gandalf Grand Master Award, chosen by vote of participants in the World Science Fiction Convention. (Thus she became the eighth and final Grand Master of Fantasy, sponsored by the Swordsmen and Sorcerers' Guild of America, in partial analogy to the Grand Master of Science Fiction sponsored by the Science Fiction Writers of America.)

Moore was an active member of the Tom and Terri Pinckard Science Fiction literary salon and a frequent contributor to literary discussions with the regular membership, including Robert Bloch, George Clayton Johnson, Larry Niven, Jerry Pournelle, Norman Spinrad, A. E. van Vogt, and others, as well as many visiting writers and speakers.

Later life
Moore developed Alzheimer's disease, but that was not obvious for several years. She had ceased to attend the meetings when she was nominated to be the first woman Grand Master of the Science Fiction Writers of America; the nomination was withdrawn at the request of her husband, Thomas Reggie, who said the award and ceremony would be at best confusing and likely upsetting to her, given the progress of her disease. She died on April 4, 1987, at her home in Hollywood, California.

Awards
 1978: Fritz Leiber Award
 1980: World Fantasy Convention Lifetime Achievement Award
 1981: Gandalf Grand Master Award
 1998: Posthumous induction into the Science Fiction and Fantasy Hall of Fame
 2004: Cordwainer Smith Rediscovery Award
 2019: Retro Hugo Award for best Novelette for the year 1944

Selected works 

 Earth's Last Citadel (with Henry Kuttner; 1943)
 The Dark World (credited to Henry Kuttner, but believed by many critics to be a collaboration, 1946) 
 Vintage Season (novella written with Henry Kuttner, as "Lawrence O'Donnell"; 1946). It was filmed in 1992 as Timescape.
 The Mask of Circe (with Henry Kuttner; 1948, Illustrated by Alicia Austin; 1971)
 Beyond Earth's Gates (1949)
 Judgment Night (stories, 1952)
 Shambleau and Others (stories, 1953)
 Northwest of Earth (stories, 1954)
 No Boundaries (with Henry Kuttner; stories, 1955)
 Doomsday Morning (1957)
 Jirel of Joiry (Paperback Library, 1969); Black God's Shadow (Donald M. Grant, 1977)—the five Jirel stories collected; the latter a limited edition with color plates, signed, numbered, and boxed
 The Best of C. L. Moore, edited by Lester Del Rey (Nelson Doubleday, 1975)—includes a biographical introduction by Lester Del Rey, which is carefully noncommittal about the influence of her personal life on her writing, and an autobiographical afterword by Moore
 Black God's Kiss (Paizo Publishing, 2007)—the five Jirel stories collected
 Northwest of Earth: The Complete Northwest Smith (Paizo Publishing, 2008)—the thirteen Northwest Smith stories collected

Explanatory notes

References

Further reading

 Bleiler, Everett F. "Fantasy, Horror...and Sex: The Early Stories of C. L. Moore". The Scream Factory (Spring 1994): 41–47.

External links 

 

 
 
 
 Moore and Lewis Padgett at Fantastic Fiction
 
 
 Rosemarie Arbur: Literary Descendants of C. L. Moore
 Past Masters - A Kuttner Above the Rest (But Wait!  There's Moore!) by Bud Webster, at Galactic Central
 Shambleau read by the author, C. L. Moore
 
 Lewis Padgett at LC Authorities, with eight records, and at WorldCat

1911 births
1987 deaths
20th-century American novelists
20th-century American women writers
American fantasy writers
American science fiction writers
American women novelists
Deaths from dementia in California
Deaths from Alzheimer's disease
Writers from Indianapolis
Science Fiction Hall of Fame inductees
University of Southern California faculty
Women science fiction and fantasy writers
World Fantasy Award-winning writers
Writers from California
Novelists from Indiana
Weird fiction writers
American women academics